Union Baptist Church is a historic church at 109 Court Street in New Bedford, Massachusetts, USA.  It was built in 1899 to a design by Nathaniel Cannon Smith in Shingle Style architecture.  The congregation was founded in 1895 by a merger of two African American congregations that had split some four decades earlier.  This historical church group was a leading New Bedford institution associated with the assistance of fugitive slaves in the pre-Civil War period.

The building was listed on the National Register of Historic Places in 2008.

See also
Times and Olympia Buildings, also designed by Smith in New Bedford and NRHP-listed.
National Register of Historic Places listings in New Bedford, Massachusetts

References

Baptist churches in Massachusetts
Churches on the National Register of Historic Places in Massachusetts
Churches completed in 1899
19th-century Baptist churches in the United States
Churches in New Bedford, Massachusetts
Shingle Style church buildings
National Register of Historic Places in New Bedford, Massachusetts
Shingle Style architecture in Massachusetts